JDS Nadashio (SS-577) was a Japanese diesel-electric  weighing 2,250 tons. It was launched on 27 January 1983 and decommissioned by the Maritime Self-Defense Force on 1 June 2001.

Design and construction
The Yūshio-class was an enlarged derivative of the preceding , with improved electronics and capable of diving to greater depths. Ten Yūshios were built, to a regular programme of one being ordered each Fiscal Year.

Displacement was  surfaced. Like the Uzushios, the class was of double-hull construction, with a streamlined teardrop hull. A  electric motor drove a single propeller shaft, while two Kawasaki-MAN diesel engines could charge the ship's batteries and power the ship on the surface. Six 21-inch (533 mm) torpedo tubes were fitted amidships, while Nadashio was the first of her class to be able to launch Sub-Harpoon anti-ship missiles. She had a crew of 75–80.

Nadashio was ordered under the Fiscal Year 1980 shipbuilding programme, and was laid down at Mitsubishi Heavy Industries' Kobe shipyard on 16 April 1981. She was launched on 27 January 1983 and commissioned on 6 March 1984.

Service
In 1987, Nadashio was the first of her class to be fitted with a towed array sonar.

On 23 July 1988 the submarine collided with and sank the sports fishing boat Fuji Maru No 1 causing the death of 30 people and injuring a further 17. Both the captain of Nadashio and the skipper of Fuji Maru No 1 were given suspended prison sentences because of the collision, while the Director General of the Japanese Defense Agency resigned as a result of the accident.

References

Yūshio-class submarines
Maritime incidents in 1988
1983 ships
Ships built by Mitsubishi Heavy Industries